The 2016 United States Grand Prix (formally known as the 2016 Formula 1 United States Grand Prix) was a Formula One motor race held on 23 October 2016 at the Circuit of the Americas in Austin, Texas, United States.

Mercedes driver Nico Rosberg entered the round with a thirty-three-point lead over teammate Lewis Hamilton in the World Drivers' Championship. Mercedes team held an unassailable 208-point lead over Red Bull Racing in the World Constructors' Championship, having secured the Constructors' title in the previous race in Japan. This was also the last time the 2009 World Champion Jenson Button scored points in a Formula One Grand Prix.

Report

Race
The race started off well for Hamilton, leading on the run up to Turn 1, with Jenson Button and a Toro Rosso running wide out of the first corner. Daniel Ricciardo slotted into second while Hamilton's teammate and closest championship rival Nico Rosberg fell back to third. Valtteri Bottas suffered a puncture and had to pit after the first lap. Nico Hülkenberg retired on lap 7 due to earlier collision damage. On the corner before the backstraight DRS zone, Esteban Gutiérrez of the Haas F1 Team locked up the front right tyre heavily and retired subsequently due to brake problems. On lap 31, Max Verstappen retired due to a gearbox problem and stopped out of the first DRS zone, triggering a Virtual Safety Car period. Kimi Räikkönen retired after coming out of the pit lane during a routine stop with a loose wheel. Hamilton went on to win his 5th race in the United States, with Nico Rosberg in second and Daniel Ricciardo rounding out the podium spots. Hamilton reduced Rosberg's lead in the Drivers' Championship to 26 points with 3 races left in the season.

Classification

Qualifying

Race

Notes
 – Kevin Magnussen received a five-second penalty after the race for an illegal overtake on Daniil Kvyat.

Championship standings after the race
Bold text indicates who still had a theoretical chance of becoming World Champion.

Drivers' Championship standings

Constructors' Championship standings

 Note: Only the top five positions are included for the sets of standings.

References

External links

2016 Formula One races
2016
Grand Prix
2016 in sports in Texas
Motorsport competitions in Texas
Sports in Austin, Texas
October 2016 sports events in the United States